Hnin An Daung Mwei Kaw (also spelled as Hnin An Daw) was a principal queen consort of King Binnya U of Martaban–Hanthawaddy. She may have been Binnya U's second chief queen consort.

Brief
Born Mwei Kaw, she was the second daughter of Minister Than-Bon of the Martaban court. She and her two sisters Mwei It and Mwei Zeik became queens of Binnya U soon after his accession. Their youngest sister Mwei Daw became a wife of Binnya U about five years later.

Her royal title was Hnin An Daung (sometimes reported as Hnin An Daw (နှင်းအံဒေါ)). She had a daughter named Tala Mi Thiri (also spelled Tala May Thiri), who became a queen of King Kue Na of Lan Na (in the 1560s and the early 1570s).

She may have succeeded Mwei It as chief queen after her elder sister's death in the mid-1560s.

Notes

References

Bibliography
 

Chief queens consort of Hanthawaddy
Queens consort of Hanthawaddy
14th-century Burmese women